Charles Coates may refer to:

 Charles Coates (sportsman) (1857–1922), English clergyman and all round sportsman
 Charles E. Coates (1866–1939), American academic, chemist, and player and coach of American football
 Charles Coates (footballer) (1912–1991), English footballer
 Charles Coates (priest) (c. 1746–1813), English cleric and antiquarian